Louis Joseph Sebert (December 4, 1886 – December 2, 1942) was a Canadian athlete.  He competed at the 1908 Summer Olympics in London.

In the 100 metres, Sebert took second place in his first round heat with a time of 11.7 seconds.  He did not advance to the semifinals. His result in the 200 metres was similar.  He placed second in his preliminary heat with a time of 22.8 seconds to not advance further.

In the 400 metres, Sebert finally won a preliminary heat.  His time of 50.2 seconds put him first among the three men in his heat.  He dropped his time to 49.5 seconds for the semifinal, but placed second behind William Robbins.

Sebert died on December 2, 1942, two days shy of his 56th birthday.

References

Sources
 
 
 

1886 births
1942 deaths
Olympic track and field athletes of Canada
Athletes (track and field) at the 1908 Summer Olympics
Canadian male sprinters